Słuszków  (1940-1945 German: Steinsdorf) a village in Kalisz County, Greater Poland Voivodeship, in west-central Poland. It is the seat of the administrative district of Gmina Mycielin.

In 1935 the "Słuszków Hoard" was discovered there.

References

Villages in Kalisz County